Regan Burns (born June 14, 1968) is an American actor, comedian, and game show host. He is best known for his role as Bennett James on Dog with a Blog, as well as being the host of the hidden camera game show Oblivious. Burns is also known for various roles in TV commercials and programs in the United States and the United Kingdom.

Career
Burns attended Radford University on a gymnastics scholarship, but gave it up to pursue theater instead. After graduating from Radford in 1990, he studied acting at the American Academy of Dramatic Arts. Burns hosted the game show Oblivious, in which Burns acted as someone or something, such as an artist or golf instructor, and asked a contestant a series of five questions in conversation. The contestant wouldn't realize it was a hoax until all questions had been asked. They would then receive money for answering questions.

Burns's other work include commentary for several E! shows. He played the arsonist Alan Shepard on Comedy Central's Halfway Home and plays a recurring character on Fox News Channel's The 1/2 Hour News Hour.  He also appeared as a citizen of Reno, Nevada in an episode of Reno 911! and had a cameo in the direct-to-DVD movie Get Smart's Bruce and Lloyd: Out of Control as a lab tech.

His work is mainly seen in TV commercials in both the United States and the United Kingdom, as he has appeared in various ads for Arby's, Capital One, Volkswagen, Holiday Inn, Enterprise Rent-A-Car, Boston Pizza, Ooma, and others. Burns has also played "Beerman" in commercials for Coors Light. He appeared in the Back to You episode "A Gentleman Always Leads," which aired October 10, 2007. In December 2007, he appeared as a cashier in a corporate stunt by Burger King titled "Whopper Freakout" where a United States Burger King franchise informs its customers the signature Whopper has been discontinued.

Burns played a teacher in two episodes of Zoey 101, and appeared in an episode of Supernatural later that year. In July 2010, he appeared in an episode of Sonny With a Chance. He has also appeared in an episode of I'm in the Band. In August 2010, Burns appeared in Zeke and Luther. From 2012 to 2015, Burns starred as Bennett James on the Disney Channel series Dog with a Blog.

Since March 2009, Burns has been a regular film review contributor (usually Thursday or Fridays) on The Marc Germain Show, on TalkRadioOne.com.

Filmography

Films

Television

References

External links

Official website (archived)

1968 births
Male actors from Georgia (U.S. state)
American male comedians
American male film actors
American game show hosts
American male television actors
Living people
Actors from Columbus, Georgia
20th-century American male actors
21st-century American male actors
20th-century American comedians
21st-century American comedians